Louis Schmidt was born on December 4, 1844 at Old Fort, near Fort Chipewyan and was baptised at Portage La Loche by Father Jean-Baptiste Thibault in July 1845. He died in Saint Louis, Saskatchewan near Batoche November 6, 1935.
In 1869 he was Secretary to the first Provisional Government organized in the Red River Colony.
Louis Schmidt sat as an elected member of the Manitoba Legislative Assembly for Saint Boniface West in 1870-1874 and again in 1878–1879.
He was the grandson of Alexis Bonami and a classmate of Louis Riel.

See also
 St. Louis, Saskatchewan
 1870 Manitoba general election

References

External links
 Louis-Schmidt
 Les memoires de Louis Schmidt

Métis politicians
People of the Red River Rebellion
Canadian Métis people
1844 births
1935 deaths
People from the Regional Municipality of Wood Buffalo
Members of the Legislative Assembly of Assiniboia
Members of the Legislative Assembly of Manitoba
Canadian Roman Catholics
Pre-Confederation Alberta people